The Kent Archaeological Society was founded in 1857 to promote the study and publication of archaeology and history, especially that pertaining to the ancient county of Kent in England. This includes the modern administrative county as well as areas now subsumed by south east London and in the district of Medway.

It carries out archaeological surveys and excavations funded through membership subscriptions as well as being involved in the protection and recording of historic buildings and churches. In addition, it organises lectures, excursions and other education projects and can make grants or loans of equipment to archaeological projects. A library in the museum at Maidstone is available for members' use and a field school, the Kent Archaeological Field School, is often run in the summer.

It publishes an annual journal, Archaeologia Cantiana, and a quarterly newsletter. Through its Record Series, it publishes editions of archival texts relating to the county, and it therefore functions as the record society for Kent. It publishes other occasional volumes on specific topics.

Recent projects have included assisting in the excavation of the Ringlemere barrow and an edition and translation of the Kent Hundred Rolls. A number of local societies are affiliated to it and it has links with national and county archaeological organisations.

External links

Online resources published by the Society

Archaeological organizations
Organizations established in 1857
History of Kent
History organisations based in the United Kingdom
Organisations based in Kent
Text publication societies
1857 establishments in England